Condensate may refer to:
 The liquid phase produced by the condensation of steam or any other gas 
 The product of a chemical condensation reaction, other than water
 Natural-gas condensate, in the natural gas industry
 Condensate (album), a 2011 album by The Original 7ven, the band formerly known as The Time

Quantum physics 
 Canonical quantization or vacuum expectation value, in quantum field theory
 Bose–Einstein condensate, a substance which occurs at very low temperatures in a system of bosons
 Fermionic condensate, a substance which occurs at very low temperatures in a system of fermions
 Gluon condensate, a non-perturbative property of the QCD vacuum

Theoretical states 
 Color-glass condensate, an extreme type of matter theorized to exist in atomic nuclei traveling near the speed of light
 Top quark condensate, an alternative theory to the Standard Model

See also
 Biomolecular condensate